Pyszczyn may refer to the following places in Poland:
Pyszczyn, Lower Silesian Voivodeship (south-west Poland)
Pyszczyn, Kuyavian-Pomeranian Voivodeship (north-central Poland)
Pyszczyn, Greater Poland Voivodeship (west-central Poland)